Geoff Strang (9 May 1944 – 20 December 2003) was an Australian rules footballer who played in the Victorian Football League (VFL) in between 1965 and 1971 for the Richmond Football Club.

Family
He was the grandson of South Melbourne footballer Bill Strang, the son of Richmond premiership player Doug Strang, nephew of dual Richmond premiership player Gordon Strang, South Melbourne footballer Allan Strang (1921-1996), and St Kilda footballer Colin Strang, and the cousin of John Perry, who also played in the 1967 Richmond premiership team.

Football
He left Richmond at the end of 1971 to play under the coaching of his former Richmond team mate Mike Patterson at North Adelaide Football Club. He played a fine game for the Roosters in their 56 point win over Port Adelaide in the 1972 SANFL Grand Final

Footnotes

References 
 Hogan P: The Tigers Of Old, Richmond FC, (Melbourne), 1996.

External links
 
 

Richmond Football Club players
Richmond Football Club Premiership players
Albury Football Club players
1944 births
2003 deaths
North Adelaide Football Club players
Two-time VFL/AFL Premiership players
Australian rules footballers from Albury